Notes From No Man's Land is a 2009 book of essays by Eula Biss.  The book won the 2008 Graywolf Press Nonfiction Prize and the National Book Critics Circle Award for Criticism.

The book deals with issues of race in America, and in particular, Biss often explores what it means to be a white woman in predominantly black spaces, the issue of white privilege, and the inherited, deeply ingrained racism of American culture.  The first essay in the collection, "Time and Distance Overcome" juxtaposes the history of telephone poles and the history of lynching into a exploration of American history.  Another essay, "Goodbye to All That", is a retelling of and response to Joan Didion's essay of the same name, which reflects on Biss's experiences living in New York City.

Contents 

 Time and Distance Overcome
 Relations
 Three Songs of Salvage
 Land Mines
 Goodbye to All That
 Black News
 Letter to Mexico
 Babylon
 Back to Buxton
 Is This Kansas
 No Man's Land
 Nobody Knows Your Name
 All Apologies

2009 non-fiction books
National Book Critics Circle Award-winning works
Essay collections
Books about race and ethnicity